Bystrzyca  is a village in the administrative district of Gmina Oława, within Oława County, Lower Silesian Voivodeship, in south-western Poland.

History

The village dates back to the Middle Ages, and, according to linguist Heinrich Adamy, its name comes from the Polish word bystry. Within medieval Piast-ruled Poland, it was the location of a motte-and-bailey castle from the 10th-13th century, which is now an archaeological site. In the 2000s, archaeologists found remains of medieval pagan and Christian burials at the site. Later on, the village was part of Bohemia (Czechia), Prussia and Germany. During World War II, the Germans operated a forced labour camp for Jewish men and women in the village from 1941 to 1944. After Germany's defeat in the war, in 1945, the village became again part of Poland.

In 1986, the Polish film Train to Hollywood was shot in Bystrzyca.

Sports
The local football club is Burza Bystrzyca. It competes in the lower leagues.

References

Villages in Oława County
Archaeological sites in Poland